Francisco "Paco" Fernández Gómez (born 25 October 1967) is a Spanish retired footballer who played as a midfielder, and the current coach of Real Oviedo's Juvenil A squad.

Playing career
Born in Oviedo, Asturias, Fernández made his professional debut with local Real Oviedo on 3 March 1985, playing the last ten minutes and scoring in an 8–0 home routing against CF Lorca Deportiva in the Segunda División. He appeared with the club in La Liga in the following seasons, which included two matches in the 1991–92 UEFA Cup.

In the 1994 summer Fernández joined CD Logroñés, also in the first division. After two years with CD Badajoz in the second level he competed in the lower leagues, representing Pontevedra CF, Gimnástica de Torrelavega, Caudal Deportivo and CD Lealtad; he retired at the end of the 2000–01 campaign with the last side, aged 34.

Manager career
After retiring Fernández began working as a coach, his first stop being amateurs Berrón CF. Afterwards he managed Lealtad, UP Langreo, and Real Avilés, always in his native region.

In May 2009 Fernández signed with another club he had represented as a player, Caudal in division four. He achieved promotion to the third division in 2010 and 2012, and also appeared in the promotion play-offs to the second tier in 2013.

On 12 July 2013 Fernández was appointed Racing de Santander manager. He led the third level club to the quarterfinals of the Copa del Rey in his first year, in spite of a severe institutional and financial crisis.

On 3 March 2015 Fernández was sacked, with the club in the relegation zone.

On 1 July 2016, Fernández signed as Burgos CF head coach. On 26 September, he was sacked after only earning one point in the first six league games.

On 27 May 2017, Fernández agreed terms with Caudal Deportivo for taking again the helm of the team four years after leaving Mieres. However, he resigned on 19 November 2017, after only earning 10 points in 15 matches.

Managerial statistics

References

External links

1967 births
Living people
Footballers from Oviedo
Spanish footballers
Association football midfielders
La Liga players
Segunda División players
Segunda División B players
Tercera División players
Real Oviedo Vetusta players
Real Oviedo players
CD Logroñés footballers
CD Badajoz players
Pontevedra CF footballers
Gimnástica de Torrelavega footballers
Caudal Deportivo footballers
CD Lealtad players
Spanish football managers
Segunda División managers
Real Avilés CF managers
Racing de Santander managers
Burgos CF managers